The Laestadius family is a Swedish family originally from Ångermanland, and mostly noted for its member Lars Levi Laestadius, the founder of the pietistic Lutheran revival movement, Laestadianism.

Notable members 

 Lars Levi Laestadius (1800–1861), founder of Laestadianism
 Carl Erik Læstadius (1775–1818), priest
 Carl Fredrik Læstadius (1848–1927), priest
 Johan Læstadius (1815–1895), priest and scholar
 Petrus Læstadius (1802–1841), priest and author
 Lars-Levi Læstadius (1909–1982)

References

Further reading 

 

Laestadius family
Swedish families